The women's quadruple sculls competition at the 1996 Summer Olympics in Atlanta, Georgia took place at Lake Lanier.

Competition format

The competition consisted of two main rounds (heats and finals) as well as a repechage. The 10 boats were divided into two heats for the first round, with 5 boats in each heat. The first-place boat in each heat (2 boats total) advanced directly to the "A" final. The remaining 8 boats were placed in the repechage. The repechage featured two heats, with 4 boats in each heat. The top two boats in each repechage heat (4 boats total) advanced to the "A" final, while the remaining 4 boats (3rd and 4th placers in the repechage heats) were sent to the "B" final. 

The boats in the "A" final competed for medals and 4th through 6th place; the boats in the "B" final competed for 7th through 10th.

All races were over a 2000 metre course.

Results

Heats

Heat 1

Heat 2

Repechage

Repechage 1

Repechage 2

Finals

Final B

Final A

References

Rowing at the 1996 Summer Olympics
Women's rowing at the 1996 Summer Olympics